Teegalapahad is a census town in Adilabad district of the Indian state of Telangana.

Demographics 

, the India census established that Teegalapahad had a population of 33,070. Males constitute 51% of the population and females 49%. Teegalapahad has an average literacy rate of 64%, higher than the national average of 59.5%: male literacy is 71%, and female literacy is 55%. In Teegalapahad, 11% of the population is under 6 years of age.

References 

Census towns in Adilabad district